Katanda may refer to:

Katanda, Russia, a locality in the Altai Republic
In the Democratic Republic of the Congo:
Katanda Territory, an administrative division of Kasaï-Oriental province
 Katanda, the town that is its administrative center
 Katanda, a village in Beni Territory of North Kivu province
Katanda, an archeological site in the upper Semliki valley